Manijeh Razeghi is an Iranian-American scientist in the fields of semiconductors and optoelectronic devices. She is a pioneer in modern epitaxial techniques for semiconductors such as low pressure metalorganic chemical vapor deposition (MOCVD), vapor phase epitaxy (VPE), molecular beam epitaxy (MBE), GasMBE, and MOMBE. These techniques have enabled the development of semiconductor devices and quantum structures with higher composition consistency and reliability, leading to major advancement in InP and GaAs based quantum photonics and electronic devices, which were at the core of the late 20th century optical fiber telecommunications and early information technology.

Her current research interests involve many cutting-edge technologies including III-Nitride semiconductor devices, quantum cascade lasers, quantum well infrared photodetectors (QWIP), and self assembled quantum dot devices.

Career
Razeghi received a bachelor's degree in Nuclear Physics from Tehran University, then her doctorate from Université de Paris, France. In 1986, she became the head of Thomson-CSF Exploratory Materials Lab and made a major contribution to the field of semiconductor physics when she developed metalorganic chemical vapor deposition (MOCVD) epitaxial technique and published her pioneering work on InP in her book "The MOCVD Challenge Volume 1: A Survey of GaInAsP-InP for Photonic and Electronic Applications" (Adam Hilger Press, 1989).

In 1991, Razeghi moved to the US to become the Walter P. Murphy Professor and Director of the Center for Quantum Devices, Department of Electrical Engineering and Computer Science, Northwestern University, where she continued her research in a broad range of quantum devices such as lasers and photodetectors. In 1995, she published her second book "The MOCVD Challenge Volume 2: A Survey of GaInAsP-GaAs for Photonic and Electronic Device Applications" (Institute of Physics Publishing, 1995).

In 2018, Professor Razeghi won the Benjamin Franklin Medal for Electrical Engineering for "the realization of high-power terahertz frequency sources operating at room temperature using specially designed and manufactured semiconductor lasers, which enables a new generation of imagers, chemical/biological sensors, and ultra-broadband wireless communication systems." She developed lasers that can detect explosives and pathogens as well as electronic devices that will eventually deliver turbo-charged, super-fast WiFi.

She holds 60 patents  and has published 20 books and more than 1000 papers. Prof. Razeghi continues to make great academic contribution at Northwestern. She created both graduate and undergraduate programs in solid-state engineering (SSE), and has supervised over 50 PhD students and over 20 Master's students.

Awards and honors

 Benjamin Franklin Medal in Electrical Engineering - 2018
 Elected Lifetime Fellow of Institute of Electrical and Electronics Engineers (IEEE) - 2017
 Jan Czochralski Gold Medal - 2016
 IBM Faculty Award - 2013
 Elected Lifetime Fellow of Materials Research Society (MRS)- 2008
 Elected Fellow of American Physical Society (APS) - 2004
 Elected Fellow of Optical Society of America (OSA) - 2004
 Elected Fellow of International Engineering Consortium (IEC) - 2003
 Elected Fellow of Society of Photo-Optical Instrumentation Engineers (SPIE)- 2000
 Society of Women Engineers (SWE) Achievement Award - 1995
IBM Europe Science and Technology Prize - 1987

Selected works 

"The MOCVD Challenge Volume 1: A Survey of GaInAsP-InP for Photonic and Electronic Applications"
"The MOCVD Challenge Volume 2: A Survey of GaInAsP-GaAs for Photonic and Electronic Device Applications" 
"Seeking Illumination"
 "Air-gapped distributed Bragg reflector improves dual-band long-wavelength IR cameras"
 "Breakthroughs Bring THz Spectroscopy, Sensing Closer to Mainstream"

References

Living people
21st-century engineers
21st-century American inventors
21st-century American physicists
21st-century women engineers
21st-century American engineers
American patent holders
Iranian emigrants to the United States
Institute directors
American women engineers
American women physicists
Women in optics
1942 births
21st-century American women scientists
Fellows of the American Physical Society